Gnorimoschema jalavai is a moth of the family Gelechiidae. It is found in southern Russia (Altai Krai, Tuva, Irkutsk Oblast, Buryatia, Zabaykalsky Krai) and the Chukotka Peninsula in the north-eastern Russian Far East. It was recently reported from Canada (Yukon).

References

Moths described in 1994
Gnorimoschema